RNAS Twatt (HMS Tern) is a former Royal Navy Air Station located near Twatt, Orkney, Scotland.

Twatt was mainly used as a training airfield. On 30 March 1944 initial plans were to make Twatt the only airfield suitable to aid the disembarkation of squadrons of the Home Fleet.

The following units were here at some point:
 700 Naval Air Squadron
 771 Naval Air Squadron
 802 Naval Air Squadron
 804 Naval Air Squadron
 807 Naval Air Squadron
 809 Naval Air Squadron
 812 Naval Air Squadron
 817 Naval Air Squadron
 818 Naval Air Squadron
 819 Naval Air Squadron
 820 Naval Air Squadron
 821 Naval Air Squadron
 822 Naval Air Squadron
 832 Naval Air Squadron
 846 Naval Air Squadron
 880 Naval Air Squadron
 884 Naval Air Squadron

References

Royal Naval Air Stations in Scotland